Waitin' on Sundown is the third studio album by American country music duo Brooks & Dunn. Released in 1994 on Arista Records, it produced the hit singles "She's Not the Cheatin' Kind", "I'll Never Forgive My Heart", "Little Miss Honky Tonk", "You're Gonna Miss Me When I'm Gone", and "Whiskey Under the Bridge". Respectively, these songs peaked at #1, #6, #1, #1, and #5 on the Hot Country Songs charts.

Track listing

Charts

Weekly charts

Year-end charts

Personnel
Brooks & Dunn
 Kix Brooks – lead vocals on tracks 3, 5, 6, 9, 10 and background vocals
 Ronnie Dunn – lead vocals on tracks 1, 2, 4, 7, 8 and background vocals

Additional musicians
 Bruce Bouton – pedal steel guitar, lap steel guitar
 Mark Casstevens – acoustic guitar, electric guitar
 Rob Hajacos – fiddle
 John Barlow Jarvis – Steinway piano, Hammond B-3 organ
 Bill LaBounty – background vocals
 Brent Mason – electric guitar
 John Wesley Ryles – background vocals
 Harry Stinson – background vocals
 Dennis Wilson – background vocals
 Lonnie Wilson – drums, percussion
 Glenn Worf – bass guitar

References

1994 albums
Brooks & Dunn albums
Arista Records albums
Albums produced by Don Cook
Albums produced by Scott Hendricks